Iulia Dumanska (born 15 August 1996) is a Romanian professional handballer who plays as a goalkeeper for CS Gloria 2018 Bistrița-Năsăud and the Romanian national team.

Early life
Born in a family of athletes, Dumanska started playing handball at the age of 11 in her hometown of Horodenka, Ukraine. Three years later she was discovered by the Martas and signed with their club Marta Baia Mare. She later graduated from high school from Anghel Saligny High School in Baia Mare. Iulia now lives in Romania where she became Romanian citizen on 5 May 2016.

Trophies  
Liga Națională:
Winner: 2019 
Cupa României:
Winner: 2015 
Supercupa României:
Winner: 2014, 2015, 2018 
EHF Cup:
Winner: 2018

Individual awards 
 Handball-Planet.com Young World Player of the Season: 2018
 Handball-Planet.com Young World Goalkeeper of the Season: 2018
 Prosport Liga Națională Goalkeeper of the Season: 2018
 Gala Premiilor Handbalului Românesc Liga Națională Goalkeeper of the Season: 2019
 Gala Premiilor Handbalului Românesc Liga Națională Most Valuable Player Award: 2019

Personal life
Dumanska speaks fluent Romanian and proudly sings the national anthem of Romania. She was given the award of Cetățean de onoare ("Honorary Citizen") of the city of Craiova in 2018.

References

External links 
 

 

1996 births
Living people
People from Horodenka
Romanian female handball players
Naturalised citizens of Romania
Romanian people of Ukrainian descent
CS Minaur Baia Mare (women's handball) players
SCM Râmnicu Vâlcea (handball) players
Expatriate handball players
Romanian expatriate sportspeople in Croatia
RK Podravka Koprivnica players